Fiat Ireland (formerly, Fiat Chrysler Automobiles Ireland) is the Irish subsidiary of Fiat Chrysler Automobiles. With an assembly plant for motor vehicles, it was part of the automotive industry in Ireland

History 
"Fiat Motors (Ireland) Limited" was founded in Dublin on 30 November 1923. It imported and sold Fiat vehicles. From 1948 to 1956, W. J. Henderson assembled Fiat vehicles for the Irish market. In 1966 the decision was made to have its own assembly plant. Assembly began in 1968. Vehicle production ended in 1984.

The company was renamed "Fiat Auto (Ireland) Limited" on 20 January 1925, Fiat Group Automobiles (Ireland) Limited on 21 January 1986, "Fiat Group Automobiles (Ireland) Limited" on 6 July 2007, "Fiat Group Automobiles Ireland Limited" on 17 July after the merger with Chrysler into "Fiat Chrysler Automobiles Ireland Limited" and on 23 March 2015 into Fiat Chrysler Automobiles Ireland Designated Activity Company.

Vehicles
The assembly of Fiat 600, 850, 1100, 124, 127 and 128 has been documented with certainty. There is an indication that basic versions were assembled in the country and variants with special equipment were imported. The 132 was also offered.

Production figures
The following are the registration numbers in Ireland for Fiat vehicles from the years Fiat Ireland assembled them. The registration numbers are not identical to the production numbers. Nonetheless, around 10,000 assembled vehicles a year have survived from 1973 to 1981.

References

External links
 

Car manufacturers of Ireland
Companies based in Dublin (city)
Vehicle manufacturing companies established in 1923
1923 establishments in Ireland
Fiat
Fiat Chrysler Automobiles
Irish subsidiaries of foreign companies